The 1998–99 NBA season was the Mavericks' 19th season in the National Basketball Association. On March 23, 1998, the owners of all 29 NBA teams voted 27–2 to reopen the league's collective bargaining agreement, seeking changes to the league's salary cap system, and a ceiling on individual player salaries. The National Basketball Players Association (NBPA) opposed to the owners' plan, and wanted raises for players who earned the league's minimum salary. After both sides failed to reach an agreement, the owners called for a lockout, which began on July 1, 1998, putting a hold on all team trades, free agent signings and training camp workouts, and cancelling many NBA regular season and preseason games. Due to the lockout, the NBA All-Star Game, which was scheduled to be played in Philadelphia on February 14, 1999, was also cancelled. However, on January 6, 1999, NBA commissioner David Stern, and NBPA director Billy Hunter finally reached an agreement to end the lockout. The deal was approved by both the players and owners, and was signed on January 20, ending the lockout after 204 days. The regular season began on February 5, and was cut short to just 50 games instead of the regular 82-game schedule.

In the 1998 NBA draft, the Mavericks selected Robert Traylor from the University of Michigan with the sixth pick, but soon traded him to the Milwaukee Bucks in exchange for top draft pick, and German basketball star Dirk Nowitzki. In the off-season, the team acquired point guard Steve Nash from the Phoenix Suns, signed free agents Gary Trent, and Hot Rod Williams, and released Khalid Reeves to free agency later on during the regular season, as he later on signed with the Detroit Pistons. However, the young Mavericks still struggled losing eight of their first nine games, but began to show promise by posting their first winning record at home in nine years at 15–10. However, with Cedric Ceballos only playing just 13 games due to a wrist injury, they were still a mile away from the playoffs as they finished fifth in the Midwest Division with a 19–31 record.

Michael Finley averaged 20.2 points, 5.3 rebounds, 4.4 assists and 1.3 steals per game, while Trent averaged 16.0 points and 7.8 rebounds per game, and Ceballos provided the team with 12.5 points per game. In addition, Shawn Bradley averaged 8.6 points, 8.0 rebounds and 3.2 blocks per game, while Hubert Davis contributed 9.1 points per game, Robert Pack averaged 8.9 points and 3.2 assists per game in only just 25 games due to injury, Nowitzki provided with 8.2 points per game, and Nash contributed 7.9 points and 5.5 assists per game. Trent also finished in third place in Most Improved Player voting.

Following the season, A.C. Green was traded back to his former team, the Los Angeles Lakers, while Samaki Walker signed as a free agent with the San Antonio Spurs, and second-year center Chris Anstey was traded to the Chicago Bulls.

Offseason

Draft picks

Robert Traylor was traded to the Milwaukee Bucks for Pat Garrity and Dirk Nowitzki.

Roster

Roster Notes
 Center Shawn Bradley holds both American and German citizenship.
 Rookie small forward Ansu Sesay missed the entire season due to a broken right foot, and never played for the Mavericks.

Regular season

Season standings

z - clinched division title
y - clinched division title
x - clinched playoff spot

Record vs. opponents

Game log

|-style="background:#fcc;"
| 1
| February 5
| @ Seattle
| 
| Cedric Ceballos (16)
| A.C. Green (11)
| Nash, Finley (5)
| KeyArena17,072
| 0–1
|-style="background:#cfc;"
| 2
| February 7
| @ Golden State
| 
| Cedric Ceballos (26)
| Dirk Nowitzki (12)
| Steve Nash (12)
| The Arena in Oakland12,039
| 1–1
|-style="background:#fcc;"
| 3
| February 9
| Utah
| 
| Cedric Ceballos (19)
| Dirk Nowitzki (9)
| Steve Nash (4)
| Reunion Arena17,070
| 1–2
|-style="background:#fcc;"
| 4
| February 11
| Houston
| 
| Robert Pack (31)
| Shawn Bradley (8)
| Michael Finley (4)
| Reunion Arena18,121
| 1–3
|-style="background:#fcc;"
| 5
| February 12
| @ Denver
| 
| Michael Finley (28)
| A.C. Green (8)
| Steve Nash (9)
| McNichols Sports Arena10,012
| 1–4
|-style="background:#fcc;"
| 6
| February 14
| @ Vancouver
| 
| Steve Nash (18)
| Shawn Bradley (10)
| Steve Nash (9)
| General Motors Place16,059
| 1–5
|-style="background:#fcc;"
| 7
| February 15
| @ Portland
| 
| Michael Finley (21)
| Samaki Walker (6)
| Steve Nash (4)
| Rose Garden18,231
| 1–6
|-style="background:#fcc;"
| 8
| February 17
| @ L.A. Lakers
| 
| Gary Trent (15)
| Cedric Ceballos (8)
| Robert Pack (7)
| Great Western Forum13,492
| 1–7
|-style="background:#fcc;"
| 9
| February 19
| @ Golden State
| 
| Michael Finley (19)
| Shawn Bradley (11)
| Finley, Nash (4)
| The Arena in Oakland11,432
| 1–8
|-style="background:#cfc;"
| 10
| February 20
| @ L.A. Clippers
| 
| Michael Finley (31)
| Cedric Ceballos (11)
| Steve Nash (6)
| Los Angeles Memorial Sports Arena10,946
| 2–8
|-style="background:#fcc;"
| 11
| February 22
| @ Phoenix
| 
| Cedric Ceballos (21)
| Shawn Bradley (7)
| Robert Pack (5)
| America West Arena18,596
| 2–9
|-style="background:#cfc;"
| 12
| February 23
| Atlanta
| 
| Michael Finley (22)
| Gary Trent (10)
| Robert Pack (8)
| Reunion Arena13,387
| 3–9
|-style="background:#cfc;"
| 13
| February 25
| Denver
| 
| Finley, Ceballos (20)
| Cedric Ceballos (13)
| Steve Nash (5)
| Reunion Arena13,203
| 4–9
|-style="background:#fcc;"
| 14
| February 26
| @ Utah
| 
| Robert Pack (18)
| Samaki Walker (8)
| Michael Finley (3)
| Delta Center19,911
| 4–10
|-style="background:#cfc;"
| 15
| February 27
| Sacramento
| 
| Gary Trent (29)
| Gary Trent (16)
| Robert Pack (6)
| Reunion Arena15,009
| 5–10

|-style="background:#cfc;"
| 16
| March 2
| L.A. Clippers
| 
| Michael Finley (20)
| A.C. Green (12)
| Michael Finley (9)
| Reunion Arena13,492
| 6–10
|-style="background:#fcc;"
| 17
| March 4
| San Antonio
| 
| Gary Trent (14)
| Dirk Nowitzki (6)
| Michael Finley (6)
| Reunion Arena14,719
| 6–11
|-style="background:#fcc;"
| 18
| March 5
| @ Utah
| 
| Michael Finley (29)
| Finley, Trent (8)
| Gary Trent (5)
| Delta Center19,539
| 6–12
|-style="background:#fcc;"
| 19
| March 7
| @ Sacramento
| 
| Trent, Finley (18)
| Gary Trent (14)
| Steve Nash (7)
| ARCO Arena14,715
| 6–13
|-style="background:#fcc;"
| 20
| March 9
| Phoenix
| 
| Michael Finley (22)
| Shawn Bradley (14)
| Michael Finley (12)
| Reunion Arena12,714
| 6–14
|-style="background:#cfc;"
| 21
| March 11
| Orlando
| 
| Gary Trent (21)
| A.C. Green (11)
| Steve Nash (11)
| Reunion Arena14,553
| 7–14
|-style="background:#cfc;"
| 22
| March 13
| Vancouver
| 
| Michael Finley (21)
| Shawn Bradley (10)
| Steve Nash (10)
| Reunion Arena14,184
| 8–14
|-style="background:#fcc;"
| 23
| March 15
| Portland
| 
| Michael Finley (21)
| A.C. Green (8)
| Michael Finley (6)
| Reunion Arena14,046
| 8–15
|-style="background:#fcc;"
| 24
| March 17
| @ New Jersey
| 
| Finley, Trent (21)
| Gary Trent (16)
| Finley, Nash (4)
| Continental Airlines Arena14,976
| 8–16
|-style="background:#fcc;"
| 25
| March 19
| @ Detroit
| 
| Michael Finley (18)
| Finley, Strickland (6)
| Michael Finley (8)
| The Palace of Auburn Hills18,152
| 8–17
|-style="background:#cfc;"
| 26
| March 20
| Sacramento
| 
| Nash, Finley, Trent (22)
| Gary Trent (11)
| Michael Finley (9)
| Reunion Arena16,161
| 9–17
|-style="background:#fcc;"
| 27
| March 22
| L.A. Lakers
| 
| Michael Finley (23)
| A.C. Green (10)
| Michael Finley (8)
| Reunion Arena18,121
| 9–18
|-style="background:#fcc;"
| 28
| March 24
| Houston
| 
| Shawn Bradley (20)
| Shawn Bradley (13)
| Michael Finley (8)
| Reunion Arena15,111
| 9–19
|-style="background:#cfc;"
| 29
| March 26
| Denver
| 
| Michael Finley (27)
| Shawn Bradley (8)
| Erick Strickland (4)
| Reunion Arena13,096
| 10–19
|-style="background:#fcc;"
| 30
| March 27
| @ San Antonio
| 
| Michael Finley (17)
| Shawn Bradley (12)
| Steve Nash (5)
| Alamodome25,921
| 10–20
|-style="background:#fcc;"
| 31
| March 29
| Seattle
| 
| Gary Trent (20)
| Samaki Walker (13)
| Erick Strickland (7)
| Reunion Arena13,311
| 10–21
|-style="background:#fcc;"
| 32
| March 30
| @ Minnesota
| 
| Gary Trent (16)
| Gary Trent (11)
| Steve Nash (10)
| Target Center15,609
| 10–22

|-style="background:#cfc;"
| 33
| April 1
| L.A. Clippers
| 
| Michael Finley (22)
| Shawn Bradley (13)
| Steve Nash (9)
| Reunion Arena13,336
| 11–22
|-style="background:#fcc;"
| 34
| April 5
| @ Minnesota
| 
| Gary Trent (26)
| Gary Trent (8)
| Steve Nash (7)
| Target Center14,107
| 11–23
|-style="background:#fcc;"
| 35
| April 7
| @ Miami
| 
| Gary Trent (27)
| Gary Trent (13)
| Steve Nash (5)
| Miami Arena15,200
| 11–24
|-style="background:#fcc;"
| 36
| April 10
| Golden State
| 
| Gary Trent (33)
| Shawn Bradley (13)
| Michael Finley (6)
| Reunion Arena14,218
| 11–25
|-style="background:#cfc;"
| 37
| April 13
| San Antonio
| 
| Michael Finley (25)
| Shawn Bradley (12)
| Steve Nash (12)
| Reunion Arena13,142
| 12–25
|-style="background:#cfc;"
| 38
| April 15
| Minnesota
| 
| Michael Finley (34)
| Gary Trent (7)
| Steve Nash (6)
| Reunion Arena13,034
| 13–25
|-style="background:#fcc;"
| 39
| April 16
| @ Phoenix
| 
| Dirk Nowitzki (29)
| Dirk Nowitzki (8)
| Robert Pack (7)
| America West Arena18,623
| 13–26
|-style="background:#fcc;"
| 40
| April 17
| Portland
| 
| Finley, Trent (24)
| Gary Trent (10)
| Michael Finley (5)
| Reunion Arena13,358
| 13–27
|-style="background:#cfc;"
| 41
| April 20
| Phoenix
| 
| Michael Finley (36)
| Finley, Bradley (10)
| Finley, Davis, Nowitzki (4)
| Reunion Arena18,121
| 14–27
|-style="background:#cfc;"
| 42
| April 21
| @ Houston
| 
| Michael Finley (27)
| Trent, Bradley (10)
| Michael Finley (11)
| Compaq Center16,285
| 15–27
|-style="background:#fcc;"
| 43
| April 22
| @ San Antonio
| 
| Michael Finley (20)
| Chris Anstey (10)
| Davis, Finley, Trent, Strickland (2)
| Alamodome18,720
| 15–28
|-style="background:#fcc;"
| 44
| April 24
| @ Sacramento
| 
| Gary Trent (32)
| Gary Trent (14)
| Michael Finley (8)
| ARCO Arena17,317
| 15–29
|-style="background:#cfc;"
| 45
| April 26
| Chicago
| 
| Michael Finley (28)
| Shawn Bradley (17)
| Davis, Trent (5)
| Reunion Arena13,011
| 16–29
|-style="background:#cfc;"
| 46
| April 27
| Vancouver
| 
| Gary Trent (20)
| Shawn Bradley (12)
| Finley, Trent (5)
| Reunion Arena12,650
| 17–29
|-style="background:#cfc;"
| 47
| April 29
| @ Houston
| 
| Finley, Nowitzki (22)
| Shawn Bradley (11)
| Hubert Davis (6)
| Compaq Center16,285
| 18–29

|-style="background:#cfc;"
| 48
| May 1
| Golden State
| 
| Michael Finley (31)
| Shawn Bradley (15)
| Davis, Strickland (6)
| Reunion Arena15,669
| 19–29
|-style="background:#fcc;"
| 49
| May 3
| @ L.A. Lakers
| 
| Michael Finley (24)
| Chris Anstey (7)
| Erick Strickland (6)
| Great Western Forum17,505
| 19–30
|-style="background:#fcc;"
| 50
| May 4
| @ Seattle
| 
| Michael Finley (34)
| Shawn Bradley (15)
| Michael Finley (6)
| KeyArena17,072
| 19–31

Player statistics

NOTE: Please write the players statistics in alphabetical order by last name.

Awards and records

Transactions

See also
 1998-99 NBA season

References

Dallas Mavericks seasons
Dallas
Dallas
Dallas